Robert Lewis Stone (26 May 1925 – 24 June 2015) was an Australian rules footballer who played with Melbourne in the Victorian Football League (VFL).

Personal life
The son of Ronald William Stone (1897–1967), and Gertrude Amy Stone (1898–1951), née Berryman, Robert Lewis Stone was born at Somerville, Victoria, on 26 May 1925.

Stone married Jean Alison Bourne in 1949. He died from a stroke on 24 June 2015, at the age of 90.

Australian rules football
Cleared to Melbourne from Somerville, Stone's football career was interrupted by his service in the Royal Australian Navy in the Second World War, enlisting as he turned 18 and serving on several ships until the end of the war.

Notes

References
 World War Two Service Record: Robert Lewis Stone (PM6415), National Archives of Australia
 World War Two Nominal Roll: Able Seaman: Robert Lewis Stone (PM6415), Department of Veterans' Affairs

External links 
 
 
 Demonwiki: Bob Stone.

1925 births
2015 deaths
Australian rules footballers from Victoria (Australia)
Melbourne Football Club players
Royal Australian Navy personnel of World War II
Royal Australian Navy sailors